Pu Yixian (born 23 December 1992) is a Chinese road cyclist, who most recently rode for UCI Women's Continental Team . She won the silver medal in the road race at the 2016 Asian Cycling Championships.

References

External links
 
 

1992 births
Living people
Chinese female cyclists
Place of birth missing (living people)
Asian Games medalists in cycling
Medalists at the 2018 Asian Games
Cyclists at the 2018 Asian Games
Asian Games silver medalists for China
21st-century Chinese women